Yu Hanchao (born 25 February 1987) is a Chinese footballer who currently plays for Chinese Super League club Shanghai Shenhua as a right-footed left winger.

Club career
Yu Hanchao started his football career  with Liaoning Whowin in 2005 after making his debut on 22 May 2005 in a 0-0 draw against Inter Shanghai. By the end of the 2005 season, he played in 13 league games and scored his first goal on 5 November 2005 in a 4-1 loss against Shandong Luneng. The next season would see Yu establish himself further by playing in thirteen more games; however, it wasn't until the 2008 league season when he would cement his position as a regular within the squad. While he my have established himself within the team, he was unable to replicate his performances that saw him break into the squad and Liaoning were relegated at the end of the 2008 league season. Despite this setback, Yu would remain with the club and helped them back into the top tier when he won the second division title with the team. Before the 2013 season started, Yu transferred to Dalian Aerbin for a then record-breaking domestic transfer fee. 

On 10 June 2014, Yu transferred to fellow Chinese Super League side Guangzhou Evergrande along with his teammate Li Xuepeng. He made his debut for the club on 10 July 2014 in a 2-1 win against Shanghai Shenhua. On 9 August 2016, Yu was kneed in the back by Egor Krimets and had to be removed from the pitch on a stretcher in a 0-0 draw against Beijing Guoan. Hospital scans revealed that he had suffered a fractured vertebrae in his spine, ruling him out for three months. He made his return on 20 November 2016 in a 1-1 draw against Jiangsu Suning in the first leg of 2016 Chinese FA Cup final, coming on for Huang Bowen in the 69th minute.

On 14 April 2020, Yu was released by Guangzhou Evergrande Taobao after he violated the team rules for altering the number plate of his vehicle and was detained for 15 days.

On 18 July 2020, Yu joined Shanghai Shenhua on a free transfer.  He made his debut for Shenhua on 25 July 2020 against his former club Guangzhou Evergrande in the opening league game of the 2020 season, which Shenhua lost 2-0. He scored his first goal for Shenhua on 27 October 2020 in a 3-1 win against Chongqing Dangdai Lifan.

On 28 July 2021, Yu missed a 94th-minute penalty against Wuhan F.C., which could have won them the game that finished 0-0.

International career
Yu was first called up to the Chinese national team in 2009 by then manager Gao Hongbo. He made his international debut on 29 May 2009 in a 1-1 draw against Germany, coming on as a substitute for Jiang Ning. On 26 June 2010, Yu scored his first and second international goals in a 4-0 home win against Tajikistan in an international friendly.

Career statistics

Club statistics
.

International statistics

International goals

Scores and results list China's goal tally first.

Honours

Club
Liaoning FC
China League One: 2009

Guangzhou Evergrande
Chinese Super League: 2014, 2015, 2016, 2017, 2019
AFC Champions League: 2015
Chinese FA Cup: 2016
Chinese FA Super Cup: 2016, 2017, 2018

Individual
Chinese Super League Domestic Golden Boot winner: 2011

References

External links
 
 
Career Player Profile at sohu.com

1987 births
Living people
Chinese footballers
Footballers from Dalian
China international footballers
Liaoning F.C. players
Dalian Professional F.C. players
Guangzhou F.C. players
Shanghai Shenhua F.C. players
Chinese Super League players
China League One players
2015 AFC Asian Cup players
2019 AFC Asian Cup players
Association football wingers